Abhiri is a rāga belonging to the tradition of Odissi music. Falling under the meḷa Karnāta, the raga uses komala gandhara, komala dhaibata and komala nisada swaras and is traditionally associated with the karuṇa rasa. The raga is mentioned in treatises such as the Gita Prakasa and Sangita Narayana.

Structure 
An ancient raga, Abhiri has been used by hundreds of poet-composers for well-over the past many centuries. It is sadaba or hexatonic and its aroha-abaroha are given below :

Aroha : S g M P d n S

Abaroha : S n d P M g S

Compositions 
Some of the well-known traditional compositions in this raga include :

 Mita Ana Go by Benudhara
 Kisori Go Tu Ta Nutana Bali by Benudhara

References 

Ragas of Odissi music